Piotr Zbylitowski (1569 – November 19, 1649) was a Polish poet. Courtier of Stanisław Górka and Stanisław Czarnkowski. In his satirical dialogues—Rozmowa szlachcica polskiego z cudzoziemcem (1600), Przygana wymyślnym strojom białogłowskim (1600), Schadzka ziemiańska (1605)—he often criticizes some customs of the Polish nobility, mainly drunkenness, quietism, luxury and disappearance of knight's spirit. He was a first cousin of Andrzej Zbylitowski

Biography
Piotr Zbylitowski was born on November 19, 1569. In 1585 he became a courtier on the court of Stanisław Górka, and in 1592 on the court of Stanisław Czarnkowski. In 1605 he settled in Marcinkowice. Since 1633 district judge deputy and since 1645 district judge of Kraków.

He died in 1649.

Notable works
 Dialogues
 Rozmowa szlachcica polskiego z cudzoziemcem (1600)
 Przygana wymyślnym strojom białogłowskim (1600)
 Schadzka ziemiańska (1605)

References
 
 

1569 births
1649 deaths
17th-century Polish poets
Polish male poets
17th-century male writers